Friedrich von Löwis of Menar was a Baltic German lieutenant-general of Scottish origin, who served in the Imperial Russian Army during the Napoleonic Wars. His family (the family name commonly spelled in English as Lewis) came from South Scotland  to Sweden around 1630. By the time of Friedrich's birth, it had become a well-established noble family settled in Livonia in the Russian Empire.

References

Further reading 
Henning von Löwis of Menar (Author), Ich wäre gern geblieben. Das Leben des Friedrich von Löwis of Menar, Verlag: Hinstorff/PRO; Auflage: 1., Aufl. (7. Dezember 2005), 
Reinhold von Klot, Generalleutnant Friedrich von Löwis of Menar, Retter der Stadt Riga im August 1812, in: Baltische Briefe, Nr. 3/4 (797/798) März/April 2015, Hrsg. Ingeborg v. Kleist, Verlag Baltische Briefe – Wolf J. v. Kleist GmbH

External links 
Russian Generals of the Napoleonic Wars: Lieutenant General Friedrich von Lowis of Menar by Alexander Mikaberidze

1767 births
1824 deaths
Russian people of Scottish descent
Russian commanders of the Napoleonic Wars
Recipients of the Order of St. George of the Third Degree
Recipients of the Order of St. Vladimir, 2nd class
Recipients of the Order of St. Anna, 1st class
Recipients of the Gold Sword for Bravery